Melba is a residential suburb in the Belconnen district of Canberra, located within the Australian Capital Territory, Australia. The suburb of Melba is named after Dame Nellie Melba (1861–1931), the first internationally recognised Australian opera soprano. The streets are named after composers, singers and other musically notable Australians or people with strong Australian connections.

Features
Located in Melba are a government run primary school (Mount Rogers Community School), and a merged secondary school, Melba Copland Secondary School, a merge of Melba High School and Copland College.

Melba Tennis Club and its eight courts are located adjacent to the playing fields. A former member of the club is Annabel Ellwood, whose highest ranking on the WTA Women's Professional Tour was 57 for singles and 60 for Doubles in 1997. Ellwood's name appears on the honour board in the clubhouse.

Political representation 
For the purposes of Australian federal elections for the House of Representatives, Melba is in the Division of Fenner.

For the purposes of Australian Capital Territory elections for the ACT Legislative Assembly, Melba is in the Ginninderra electorate.

Geology

A porphyry of Green-grey Dacitic intrusive containing large white Feldspar crystals is found in the north east corner. Green grey dacitic tuff from the Hawkins Volcanics occur on the south east side of Melba. Green grey dacite and quartz andesite occur in the north west to the south east. This is intruded by a band of Glebe Farm Adamellite. Deakin Volcanics purple rhyodacite with a patch of purple and green tuff are in the south west. The Deakin Fault runs north west through Melba and is marked by quartz.

People honoured in the streets of Melba

 Alda Place – Frances Alda, New Zealand-born soprano
 Amadio Place – Neville Amadio, flautist
 Bainton Crescent – Edgar Bainton, British composer and Director of the New South Wales Conservatorium of Music
 Bishop Place – John Bishop (1903 – 1964), music academic and pioneer.
 Boult Place – Arthur Boult, organist, the first organist at St Peter's Cathedral, Adelaide, 1877–91.
 Bowden Place – Alfred Henry Bowden, violinist and pianist.
 Brahe Place – May Brahe (1884–1956), composer
 Brash Place – James Brash (1881–1861), composer, conductor and adjudicator; Musical Editor, Chappell and Company.
 Brier Place – Percy Brier, (1885–1970), pianist, organist, conductor and composer; a founder of the Brisbane Chamber Music Society; founded the Music Teachers' Association of Queensland, and the Guild of Composers.
 Brownlee Place – John Brownlee, baritone who often sang with Melba
 Buckman Place
 Cade Place – William Cade, first conductor of the Adelaide Symphony Orchestra
 Carandini Street – Marie Carandini, soprano
 Carey Place
 Castles Place – Amy Castles (1880–1951), soprano
 Charvin Court – Yvonne Charvin (née Leverrier) (1879-1917); studied piano with Josef Kretschmann, Sydney, 1896, and with Leschetitsky, Vienna, 1898; taught and performed in Paris; returned to Australia in 1903; performed at the Sydney Town Hall in 1904; taught at the NSW Conservatorium; decorated by the French Government with Croix Rouge Francaise for concert work for Red Cross, 1914–15; sister of Frank Leverrier.
 Chinner Crescent – Norman Chinner (1909–1961), organist and conductor
 Clifford Crescent
 Clutsam Place – George Clutsam, piano accompanist to Melba, composer
 Conley Drive
 Coutts Place
 Crossley Close – Ada Crossley, contralto, renowned in oratorio
 Delaney Court
 D'Hage Circuit – Louis D'Hage, violinist and teacher
 Ennis Place
 Flower Place
 Goldner Circuit – Richard Goldner, Romanian-born violist and founder of Musica Viva Australia
 Goossens Place – Sir Eugene Goossens, composer, conductor and advocate for the building of the Sydney Opera House
 Grainger Circuit – Percy Grainger, pianist and composer
 Alfred Hill Drive – Alfred Hill, composer

 Henslowe Place
 Horsley Cres
 Hosking Place
 Ives Court
 Keats Place – Horace Keats (1895–1945), UK-born composer
 Kruse Place
 Laver Place- 
 Le Gallienne Street – Dorian Le Gallienne, composer and critic
 Levey Place
 Linger Place – Carl Linger, German-born composer
 Lovelock Court – Dr William Lovelock, English composer and critic, and first Director of the Queensland Conservatorium of Music
 Lyster Place
 McEachern Crescent – Malcolm McEachern, bass singer in opera and oratorio; he made a famous recording of the Gendarmes' Duet with Harold Williams
 Marsh Place – composer and music publisher in late 1800s
 Mewton Place – Noel Mewton-Wood, pianist
 Miranda Place
 Orchard Place – W. Arundel Orchard, organist, pianist, composer, conductor, and Director of the New South Wales Conservatorium of Music
 Paling Place – Willem Paling (1825–1895), Dutch-born violinist, teacher, piano manufacturer and founder of Paling's music stores
 Sampson Close
 Saville Close
 Scarlett Street – Robert Dalley-Scarlett (1887–1959), organist and choral conductor
 Sharp Place
 Sherwin Place
 Stewart Crescent – Nellie Stewart, actress and popular singer
 Stralia Place – Elsa Stralia, soprano
 Traynor Court
 Treharne Place
 Verbrugghen Street – Henri Verbrugghen, Belgian violinist and first Director of the New South Wales Conservatorium of Music
 Wallace Place
 Zelman Place – Alberto Zelman, founder and conductor of the Melbourne Symphony Orchestra

References
 

Suburbs of Canberra
1972 establishments in Australia
Nellie Melba